Youssouf Touré (born March 14, 1986 in Saint-Denis, Seine-Saint-Denis) is a French professional footballer who currently plays for Becamex Bình Dương.

Individuals
Top scorer(s):
Mekong Club Championship: 2017

References
 Youssouf Touré at foot-national.com
 
 

1986 births
Living people
Sportspeople from Saint-Denis, Seine-Saint-Denis
French footballers
French expatriate footballers
French sportspeople of Ivorian descent
Ligue 2 players
US Albi players
Tours FC players
SR Colmar players
Gazélec Ajaccio players
Rodez AF players
Paris FC players
Vendée Poiré-sur-Vie Football players
FC Mantois 78 players
Association football forwards
Footballers from Seine-Saint-Denis